Super Pro or variant, may refer to:

 Hammarlund Super Pro (radioset), the "Super Pro", a radio receiver made by Hammarlund
 Randy Rose (born 1956) pro wrestler with the ring name "Super Pro"
 NFL SuperPro (comic book), a comic book published by Marvel Comics starring the eponymous character
 NFL SuperPro (character), a comic book character featured on the eponymous Marvel Comics comic book NFL SuperPro
 Super Pro (class), a driver classification in British Drift Championship
 Super Pro (class), a driver classification in drag racing
 McCulloch Super Pro (chainsaw), a chainsaw model line built by McCulloch Motors Corporation
 Ricochet Super Pro (MT-4A), a home videogame console made by Ricochet Electronics, see List of first generation home video game consoles

See also

 Super-Pro Wrestling, a wrestling tour, see List of professional wrestling promoters in the United States
 
 
 
 
 Super (disambiguation)
 Pro (disambiguation)